The Wellesley Club building is a historic building in Wellington, New Zealand.

It was designed by William Gray Young. Young was awarded the NZIA Gold Medal in 1932 for this building.

The building is part of the Stout Street Heritage Area, a collection of nearby heritage buildings.

It is now home to a hotel, the Wellesley Boutique Hotel.

References 

Buildings and structures in Wellington City
Heritage New Zealand Category 1 historic places in the Wellington Region
Buildings and structures completed in 1932
1900s architecture in New Zealand